The 1926 Ottawa Senators finished in 1st place in the Interprovincial Rugby Football Union with a 5–1 record and successfully repeated as Grey Cup champions by winning the 14th Grey Cup. It was the second Grey Cup championship won by the franchise and was the first ever repeat by an IRFU team.

Regular season

Standings

Schedule

Postseason

References

Ottawa Rough Riders seasons
James S. Dixon Trophy championship seasons
Grey Cup championship seasons